The Carmarthenshire Railway was a horse-worked plateway built in South Wales in 1803.

History 

The Carmarthenshire Railway or Tramroad was authorised under an Act of Parliament of 3 June 1802 – the first granted for a public railway in Wales – to acquire the existing Carmarthenshire Dock at Llanelly and its feeder tramroad built by Alexander Raby by 1799, thus incidentally becoming the world's first dock-owning public railway company. The first  from Cwmddyche ironworks down to the sea was open in May 1803 – the first stretch of public railway in use in Britain – and construction ceased in 1805 when the line had reached Gorslas.

The line ceased to operate in or before 1844 and portions of its course were utilised by the Llanelly and Mynydd Mawr Railway, opened in 1881.

References 

4 ft gauge railways in Wales
Early Welsh railway companies
Transport in Carmarthenshire
Rail transport in Carmarthenshire
Railway lines opened in 1803
Horse-drawn railways
Railway lines closed in 1844